Tsambagarav is a mountain between Khovd Province and Bayan-Ölgii Province in western Mongolia, it is a mountain of the Altai Mountains range. It has two peaks, its highest peak "Tsast Uul" (lit. The mountain is the stand-alone eternally snow-capped mountain of the Mongol Altai and the regional sacred mountain in Mongolia. 

Massif of Tsast Uul-Tsambagarev. Italians Gianni Pais Becher, Gastone Lorenzini and Elziro Molin climbed in western Mongolia in June and July. In late June, they first climbed Tsast Uul (4250 meters, 13,944 feet), the second highest peak in Mongolia, by the normal route. On June 27, they established Base Camp at 2520 meters north of the massif and the next day placed a camp in an alpine meadow. On June 29 the three Italians with Mongolians Jndonpuncav, Gotov, Samubun and Battulga climbed a 55° ice slope to the summit of unclimbed P 4030 (13,222 feet). On June 30, they moved camp to Tavan Betchir. On July 2, they started for a peak they had seen from Tsast Uul. They had to climb over a ridge to 3800 meters, down the far side, across a glacier and finally up the icy, 60° northwest face of P 4150 (13,616 feet). The summit was reached by Pais Becher, Molin, Mongolians Dorjpalam, Tumentogootch, Damba, Rentsenbyamba, Gaadamba and Vantchig

See also
 Tsambagarav Uul National Park
 List of mountains in Mongolia
 List of Ultras of Central Asia

References

Altai Mountains
Mountains of Mongolia